José de Jesus Filho (8 December 1927 – 31 December 2021) was a Brazilian jurist and politician. He served on the Superior Court of Justice from 1986 to 1997 and served as acting Minister of Justice for six days in April 1998. He died on 31 December 2021, at the age of 94.

References

1927 births
2021 deaths
Brazilian jurists
Ministers of Justice of Brazil
People from Minas Gerais